The 1992 CIS Athletics Championships was an international outdoor track and field competition for athletes from countries within the Commonwealth of Independent States. It was held on 22–24 June at Lokomotiv Stadium in Moscow, Russia. A total of 37 events were contested over three days.

This was the only time the competition was held, precipitated by the dissolution of the Soviet Union in 1991 and the need to select athletes for the Unified Team at the 1992 Summer Olympics. After 1992, the former Soviet states each sent their own national teams and held their own national championships. The outdoor CIS competition followed the 1992 CIS Indoor Athletics Championships, which had served as the unified team selection meet for the 1992 European Athletics Indoor Championships.

There was no team aspect to the championships, thus relay races were not held. CIS competitions for racewalking, throwing and cross country running were held separately. The CIS Cross Country Championships was used to select the CIS team for the 1992 IAAF World Cross Country Championships. Highlights included a Russian national record of 10.82 seconds by Irina Privalova in the women's 100 metres and a Belarusian record 70.36 m by Natalya Shikolenko in the women's javelin throw.

Championships
1 February - CIS Cross Country Championships (Kislovodsk)
21–23 February - CIS Winter Throwing Championships (Adler)
22 February - CIS Winter Race Walking Championships (Sochi)
25 April - CIS 50 Kilometres Race Walking Championship (Moscow)
30 May - CIS Race Walking Championships (Moscow)
22–24 June – CIS Athletics Championships (Moscow)

Results

Men

Women

CIS Cross Country Championships 
The CIS Cross Country Championships were held on 1 February in Kislovodsk, Stavropol Territory, Russia.

Men

Women

CIS Winter Throwing Championships 
The CIS Winter Throwing Championships were held 21-23 February in Adler at the Labor Reserves stadium.

Men

Women 

Note: Only one athlete competed in the senior women's hammer throw. The remaining participants competed in the under-23 and under-20 age groups.

CIS Winter Race Walking Championships 
The CIS Winter Race Walking Championships were held on February 22 in Sochi.

Men

Women

CIS 50 Kilometres Race Walking Championships 
The CIS 50 Kilometres Race Walking Championships was held on 25 April in Moscow. The top three athletes appeared to all surpass the existing world record – the winner Valeriy Spitsyn by more than four minutes. However, the times were discounted as further investigation revealed the route was short of the required 50 kilometres. Only men competed at this distance

CIS Race Walking Championships 
The CIS Race Walking Championships was held on 30 May in Moscow.

Men

Women

Unified team selection
As a result of the performance at the CIS Championships, the following athletes were selected for the Olympic Unified Team.

Men
100 m: Vitaly Savin, Pavel Galkin.
200 m: Edwin Ivanov.
400 m: Dmitry Kosov.
800 m: Anatoly Makarevich.
1500 m: Azat Rakipov.
5000 m: Andrey Tikhonov.
10,000 m: Oleg Strizhakov.
Marathon: Jacob Tolstikov.
3000 m steeplechase: Ivan Konovalov, Vladimir Golyas.
110 m hurdles: Sergey Usov, Vladimir Shishkin, Vadim Kurach.
400 m hurdles: Vadim Zadoynov, Oleg Tverdokhleb.
High jump: Igor Paklin, Yuri Sergienko.
Pole Vault: Maxim Tarasov, Igor Trandenkov, Sergey Bubka.
Long jump: Dmitry Bagryanov, Vadim Ivanov.
Triple jump: Alexander Kovalenko, Leonid Voloshin, Vasily Sokov.
Shot put: Andrei Nemchaninov, Vyacheslav Lyho, Alexander Klimenko.
Discus throw: Vladimir Zinchenko, Dmitry Shevchenko, Dmitry Kovtsun.
Hammer throw: Igor Astapkovich, Andrei Abduvaliev, Igor Nikulin.
Javelin throw: Viktor Zaitsev, Dmitry Polyunin, Andrey Shevchuk.
Decathlon: Edward Hämäläinen, Ramil Ganiev, Victor Radchenko.
20 km walk: Mikhail Schennikov, Vladimir Andreev, Oleg Troshin.
50 km walk: Alexander Potashev, Andrey Perlov, Valery Spitsyn.
4 × 100 m relay: Vitaly Savin, Pavel Galkin, Edwin Ivanov, Andrey Fedoriv.
4 × 400 m relay: Dmitry Kosov, Dmitry Kliger, Dmitry Golovastov, Oleg Tverdokhleb.

Women

100 m: Irina Privalova, Olga Bogoslovskaya.
200 m: Galina Malchugina, Irina Privalova, Marina Trandenkova.
400 m: Olga Nazarova, Olga Bryzgina, Elena Ruzina.
800 m: Lilia Nurutdinova, Lyubov Gurina, Inna Evseeva.
1500 m: Lyudmila Rogacheva, Tatyana Samolenko, Ekaterina Podkopaeva.
3000 m: Elena Romanova, Tatiana Samolenko, Elena Kopytova.
10,000 m: Elena Vyazova, Olga Bondarenko, Lyudmila Matveyeva.
Marathon: Valentina Egorova, Ramilya Burangulova, Madina Biktagirova.
100 m hurdles: Lyudmila Narozhilenko, Marina Azyabina, Natalya Kolovanova.
400 m hurdles: Tatiana Ledovskaya, Margarita Ponomareva, Vera Ordina.
High jump: Olga Turchak, Tatyana Shevchik, Olga Bolshova.
Long jump: Inessa Kravets, Larisa Berezhnaya, Irina Mushailova.
Shot put: Natalya Lisovskaya, Svetlana Kriveleva, Vita Pavlysh.
Discus throw: Larisa Korotkevich, Olga Burova, Irina Yatchenko.
Javelin throw: Natalia Shikolenko, Irina Kostyuchenkova, Elena Svezhentseva.
Heptathlon: Irina Belova, Angela Atroshchenko.
10 km walk: Alina Ivanova, Elena Nikolaeva, Elena Saiko.
4 × 100 m relay: Galina Malchugina, Irina Privalova, Olga Bogoslovskaya, Marina Trandenkova.
4 × 400 m relay: Olga Nazarova, Olga Bryzgina, Elena Ruzina, Marina Shmonina, Lyudmila Dzhigalova, Lilia Nurutdinova.

References

Results
Чернов Е. Последний чемпионат? Открытый чемпионат СНГ, Москва (22—24.06): Атлеты СНГ // Лёгкая атлетика : журнал. — 1992. — № 8—9. — С. 24—25.
На стадионах страны и мира. Чемпионат и первенство СНГ по кроссу // Лёгкая атлетика : журнал. — 1992. — № 4. — С. 23.
На стадионах страны и мира. Открытый зимний чемпионат и первенство СНГ среди молодёжи и юниоров по метаниям // Лёгкая атлетика : журнал. — 1992. — № 5. — С. 25.
На стадионах страны и мира. Открытый зимний чемпионат СНГ и первенство среди молодёжи и юниоров по спортивной ходьбе (шоссе) // Лёгкая атлетика : журнал. — 1992. — № 5. — С. 25.
На стадионах страны и мира. Открытый чемпионат СНГ по спортивной ходьбе // Лёгкая атлетика : журнал. — 1992. — № 8—9. — С. 36.

Soviet Athletics Championships
CIS Athletics Championships
CIS Athletics Championships
CIS Athletics Championships
1992 in Moscow
Sports competitions in Moscow
Athletics competitions in Russia
Athletics in Moscow
CIS Championships